Psalm 67 is the 67th psalm of the Book of Psalms, beginning in English in the King James Version: "God be merciful unto us, and bless us; and cause his face to shine upon us". In Latin, it is known as "Deus misereatur". In the slightly different numbering system of the Greek Septuagint version of the Bible, and in the Latin Vulgate, this psalm is Psalm 66. Its theme is a prayer for God's mercy, blessing and light.

The psalm forms a regular part of Jewish, Catholic, Lutheran, Anglican and other Protestant liturgies. It has been paraphrased in hymns and set to music.

Biblical commentator Cyril Rodd divides it into three sections: two "broadly parallel" sections in verses 1-3 and 4–5, which seek God's favour and blessing, and verses 6–7, which express universal joy as "all the nations"  experience God's blessing. Verses 3 and 5 are a repeated refrain:
May the nations praise you, O God.Yes, may all the nations praise you. Text 
 King James Version 
 God be merciful unto us, and bless us; and cause his face to shine upon us; Selah.
 That thy way may be known upon earth, thy saving health among all nations.
 Let the people praise thee, O God; let all the people praise thee.
 O let the nations be glad and sing for joy: for thou shalt judge the people righteously, and govern the nations upon earth. Selah.
 Let the people praise thee, O God; let all the people praise thee.
 Then shall the earth yield her increase; and God, even our own God, shall bless us.
 God shall bless us; and all the ends of the earth shall fear him.

 Uses 
 Judaism 
In some congregations, Psalm 67 is recited before Maariv on Motzei Shabbat. It's also recited by some before Barukh she'amar and after counting the Omer.

Catholic Church
Saint Benedict of Nursia selected this psalm as the first psalm of the solemn office at the Sunday lauds. (Rule of St. Benedict, chapter XII). In a certain number of abbeys which maintain tradition, this Sunday service always begins with it. Saint Benedict also asked to perform this psalm during the lauds of the week (chapter XIII). However, other psalms later replaced Psalm 66 (67), with the exception of Sunday, so that all 150 psalms are read weekly.

It is one of the four invitatory prayers of the daily office, and is recited at the vespers of Wednesday of the second week, 8 and at the lauds of the Tuesday of the third week of the four weekly cycle of liturgical prayers.

It is read or sung at several Masses throughout the year because of its theme of the universal grace of God: on the Friday of the third week of Advent, and in the octave of the nativity of Mary. It is also found on the 20th Sunday of the year A (the first of the three years of the cycle of readings intended to ensure that "a more representative portion of sacred Scripture should be read to the people over a prescribed number of years"), the 6th Sunday of Easter in year C and the Wednesday of the 4th week of Easter.

Anglican Church
In the Church of England's Book of Common Prayer, this psalm is appointed to be read on the evening of the 12th day of the month, and it may be recited as a canticle in the Anglican liturgy of Evening Prayer according to the Book of Common Prayer as an alternative to the Nunc dimittis, when it is referred to by its incipit as the Deus misereatur, also A Song of God's Blessing.

 Lutheran churches 
Martin Luther paraphrased the psalm in the hymn "Es woll uns Gott genädig sein", used particularly in Lutheran churches. In earlier hymnbooks this was set to the old chorale tune "Es wolle Gott uns gnädig sein", but the new Lutheran Service Book also provides a newer tune, "Elvet Banks".

 Musical settings 
One English hymn paraphrase of this psalm is "God of mercy, God of grace" by Henry Francis Lyte, generally sung to the tune "Heathlands" by Henry Smart. Musical settings of Psalm 67 were composed by Thomas Tallis, Samuel Adler, Charles Ives, and Alan Hovhaness.

Heinrich Schütz set Psalm 67 in a metred version in German, "Es woll uns Gott genädig sein", SWV 164, as part of the Becker Psalter'', first published in 1628.

References

External links 

 
 
  in Hebrew and English - Mechon-mamre
 Text of Psalm 67 according to the 1928 Psalter
 Psalm 67 – A Missionary Psalm text and detailed commentary, enduringword.com
 For the leader; with stringed instruments. A psalm; a song. / May God be gracious to us and  bless us; / may his face shine upon us text and footnotes, usccb.org United States Conference of Catholic Bishops
 Psalm 67:1 introduction and text, biblestudytools.com
 Psalm 67 / God be gracious to us and bless us / and make his face to shine upon us Church of England
 Psalm 67 at biblegateway.com
 Calvin's Commentaries, Vol. 10: Psalms, Part III, tr. by John King, (1847-50) / Psalm 67 sacred-texts.com
 Charles H. Spurgeon: Psalm 67 detailed commentary, archive.spurgeon.org

067